John Moren Campbell (September 10, 1916 – June 14, 1999) was an American politician who served as the 21st governor of New Mexico from January 1, 1963 until January 1, 1967.

Early life and education 
Campbell was born in Hutchinson, Reno County, Kansas, and educated at Washburn University, where he received an undergraduate degree in 1938 and an LL.B degree in 1940.

Career 
During World War II, Campbell served in the United States Marine Corps. After the war, he established a legal practice in Albuquerque, New Mexico, while working as an agent for the Federal Bureau of Investigation.

In 1955, Campbell began his career in politics when he was elected to the New Mexico House of Representatives, where he served until 1962, after having spent the last two years as Speaker.

In 1962, he was the Democratic nominee for governor and defeated incumbent Edwin L. Mechem 130,933 to 116,184. Two years later, in 1964, he became the first New Mexico governor in 12 years to win re-election.

In office, Campbell supported programs to aid the mentally ill, and appointed the first state science adviser.  In 1963 he called for an overhaul in the New Mexico Constitution and convinced the legislature to create a Constitutional Revision Commission, which eventually led to the 1969 New Mexico Constitutional Convention.

After leaving office, he served on the Atomic Safety and Licensing Board.

Death 
Campbell died in Santa Fe, New Mexico in 1999.

References

External links
National Governors Association profile
 New York Times obituary, June 18, 1999
 Meeting with President John F. Kennedy in the Oval Office, May 23, 1963: http://www.jfklibrary.org/Asset-Viewer/Archives/JFKWHP-AR7936-A.aspx

1916 births
1999 deaths
United States Marine Corps personnel of World War II
Democratic Party governors of New Mexico
Speakers of the New Mexico House of Representatives
Democratic Party members of the New Mexico House of Representatives
Federal Bureau of Investigation agents
Washburn University alumni
Politicians from Hutchinson, Kansas
20th-century American lawyers
20th-century American politicians